is a prefecture of Japan located in the Kantō region of Honshu. Gunma Prefecture has a population of 1,937,626 (1 October 2019) and has a geographic area of 6,362 km2 (2,456 sq mi). Gunma Prefecture borders Niigata Prefecture and Fukushima Prefecture to the north, Nagano Prefecture to the southwest, Saitama Prefecture to the south, and Tochigi Prefecture to the east.

Maebashi is the capital and Takasaki is the largest city of Gunma Prefecture, with other major cities including Ōta, Isesaki, and Kiryū. Gunma Prefecture is one of only eight landlocked prefectures, located on the northwestern corner of the Kantō Plain with 14% of its total land being designated as natural parks.

History 

The ancient province of Gunma was a center of horse breeding and trading activities for the newly immigrated continental peoples. The arrival of horses and the remains of horse tackle coincides with the arrival of a large migration from the mainland. From this point forward, the horse became a vital part of Japanese military maneuvers, quickly displacing the older Yayoi tradition of fighting on foot.

When Mount Haruna erupted in the late 6th century, Japan was still in the pre-historical phase (prior to the importation of the Chinese writing system during the Nara period). The Gunma Prefectural archaeology unit in 1994 was able to date the eruption through zoological anthropology at the corral sites that were buried in ash.

In the past, Gunma was joined with Tochigi Prefecture and called Kenu Province. This was later divided into Kami-tsu-ke (Upper Kenu, Gunma) and Shimo-tsu-ke (Lower Kenu, Tochigi). The area is sometimes referred to as Jomo (上毛, Jōmō). For most of Japanese history, Gunma was known as the province of Kozuke.

In the early period of contact between western nations and Japan, particularly the late Tokugawa, it was referred to by foreigners as the "Joushu States", inside (fudai, or loyalist) Tokugawa retainers and the Tokugawa family symbol is widely seen on public buildings, temples, and shrines.

The Tenmei eruption of Mount Asama occurred in 1783, causing enormous damage.

The first modern silk factories were built with Italian and French assistance at Annaka in the 1870s.

In the early Meiji period, in what was locally called the Gunma Incident of 1884, a bloody struggle between the idealistic democratic westernizers and the conservative Prussian-model nationalists took place in Gunma and neighboring Nagano. The modern Japanese army gunned down farmers with new repeating rifles built in Japan. The farmers in Gunma were said to be the first victims of the Murata rifle.

In the twentieth century, the Japanese aviation pioneer Nakajima Chikushi of Oizumi, Gunma Prefecture, founded the Nakajima Aircraft Company. At first, he produced mostly licensed models of foreign designs, but beginning with the all-Japanese Nakajima 91 fighter plane in 1931, his company became a world leader in aeronautical design and manufacture, with its headquarters at Ota, Gunma Ken. The factory now produces Subaru motorcars and other products under the name of Subaru née Fuji Heavy Industries.

In the 1930s, German architect Bruno Julius Florian Taut lived and conducted research for a while in Takasaki.

The Girard incident, which disturbed US-Japanese relations in the 1950s, occurred in Gunma in 1957, at Soumagahara Base near Shibukawa.

Four modern prime ministers are from Gunma, namely, Takeo Fukuda, Yasuhiro Nakasone, Keizo Obuchi, and Yasuo Fukuda, the son of Takeo.

Geography 

One of only eight landlocked prefectures in Japan, Gunma is the northwesternmost prefecture of the Kantō plain. Except for the central and southeast areas, where most of the population is concentrated, it is mostly mountainous. To the north are Niigata and Fukushima prefectures, while to the east lies Tochigi Prefecture. To the west lies the Nagano Prefecture, and the Saitama Prefecture is to the south.

Some of the major mountains in Gunma are Mount Akagi, Mount Haruna, Mount Myōgi, Mount Nikkō-Shirane and Mount Asama, which is located on the Nagano border. Major rivers include the Tone River, the Agatsuma River, and the Karasu River.

As of 1 April 2012, 14% of the total land area of the prefecture was designated as Natural Parks, namely Jōshin'etsu-kōgen, Nikkō, and Oze National Parks and Myōgi-Arafune-Saku Kōgen Quasi-National Park.

Cities 

Twelve cities are located in Gunma Prefecture:

 Annaka
 Fujioka
 Isesaki
 Kiryū
 Maebashi (capital)
 Midori
 Numata
 Ōta
 Shibukawa
 Takasaki
 Tatebayashi
 Tomioka

Towns and villages 

These are the towns and villages in each district:

 Agatsuma District
 Higashiagatsuma
 Kusatsu
 Naganohara
 Nakanojō
 Takayama
 Tsumagoi
 Kanra District
 Kanra
 Nanmoku
 Shimonita

 Kitagunma District
 Shintō
 Yoshioka
 Ōra District
 Chiyoda
 Itakura
 Meiwa
 Ōizumi
 Ōra
 Sawa District
 Tamamura

 Tano District
 Kanna
 Ueno
 Tone District
 Katashina
 Kawaba
 Minakami
 Shōwa

Mergers

Climate 

Because Gunma is situated in inland Japan, the difference in temperature in the summer compared to the winter is large, and there is less precipitation. This is because of the karakkaze ("empty wind"), a strong, dry wind that occurs in the winter when the snow falls on the coasts of Niigata. The wind carrying clouds with snow are obstructed by the Echigo Mountains, and it also snows there, although the high peaks do not let the wind go past them. For this reason, the wind changes into the kara-kaze.

 Climate in Maebashi
 Average yearly precipitation: 1,163 mm (approx. 45.8in)
 Average yearly temperature: 14.2 degrees Celsius (approx. 57.6 degrees Fahrenheit)

Economy 

Gunma's modern industries include transport equipment and electrical equipment, concentrated around Maebashi and the eastern region nearest Tokyo. More traditional industries include sericulture and agriculture. Gunma's major agricultural products include cabbages and konnyaku. Gunma produces over 90% of Japan's konnyaku, and two-thirds of the farms in the village of Tsumagoi are cabbage farms. Also, the city of Ōta is famous for the car industry, notably the Subaru factory.

Culture 
There is a local dialect, known in Japanese as 'gunma-ben' or 'jōshū-ben'.

Gunma has a traditional card game called . It features people, places, and things of regional and/or cultural importance.

Famous Foods 
In 2007, the Ministry of Agriculture, Forestry and Fisheries held an event to find the top 100 best local dishes across all of Japan. Three dishes were featured from Gunma; yaki-manju, okkirikomi, and konnyaku.

Melody Roads 
As of 2018, Gunma is home to eleven of Japan's over thirty Melody Roads. 2,559 grooves cut into a 175-meter stretch of the road surface in transmit a tactile vibration through the wheels into the car body. The roads can be found in Katashina, Minakami, Takayama, Kanna, Ueno, Kusatsu, Tsumagoi, Nakanojo, Takasaki, Midori, and Maebashi. Each is of a differing length and plays a different song.  Naganohara also used to be home to a Melody Road playing “Aj, lučka lučka siroka”, though the road in question was paved over in 2013 due to noise complaints.

Songs 
 Kusatsu - “Kusatsu-Bushi”
 Takayama - “When You Wish Upon a Star” 
 Tsumagoi - “Oh My Darling Clementine”
 Nakanojo - “Always With Me” (Japanese title: いつも何度でも, itsumo nando demo) from Spirited Away when driven at 40 km/h
 Katashina - “Memories of Summer” when driven over at 50 km/h

List of governors of Gunma Prefecture (1947–present)

Education

Universities 
 Isesaki
 Jobu University – Isesaki Campus
 Tokyo University of Social Welfare – Isesaki Campus
 Maebashi
 Gunma University
 Maebashi Institute of Technology
 Midori
 Kiryu University
 Ota
 Kanto Gakuen University
 Takasaki
 Takasaki City University of Economics
 Takasaki University of Commerce
 Takasaki University of Health and Welfare
 Gunma Paz College
 Jobu University -Takasaki Campus
 Tamamura
 Gunma Prefectural Women's University

Sports 

The sports teams listed below are based in Gunma.

Baseball
 Gunma Diamond Pegasus

Football (soccer)
 Thespakusatsu Gunma  (Kusatsu)
 Tonan Maebashi (Maebashi)

Rugby
 Panasonic Wild Knights  (Ota)

Basketball
Gunma Crane Thunders
Gunma is also famous for its ski resorts in the mountains.

Gunma was the only prefecture in Japan to have all 4 legal types of gambling on races: horse, bicycle, auto and boat. This changed with the closing of the last horse race track in Takasaki in 2004.

Tourism 
Gunma has many hot spring resorts and the most famous is Kusatsu Onsen. Another draw to the mountainous Gunma is the ski resorts.

Other attractions include:
 Lake Nozori
 Hara Museum Arc
 Ikaho Sistina Trick Art Museum
 Mount Haruna
 Kusatsu Alpine-Plant Museum
 Kusatsu Hot-Spring Museum
 Mount Kusatsu-Shirane
 Mount Tanigawa
 Mount Akagi
 Mount Myōgi
 The Museum of Modern Art, Gunma
Konnyaku Park
Shorinzan Daruma Temple

Transportation

Rail
 JR East
 Joetsu Shinkansen
 Hokuriku Shinkansen
 Takasaki Line
 Shinetsu Line (Takasaki-Yokokawa)
 Joetsu Line
 Agatsuma Line
 Ryomo Line
 Hachiko Line (Kuragano-)
 Tobu Railway
 Isesaki Line
 Nikko Line (Itakura Tōyōdai-mae Station)
 Sano Line
 Kiryu Line
 Joshin Electric Railway (Takasaki-Shimonita)
 Jomo Electric Railway (Chuo Maebashi-Nishi Kiryu)
 Watarase Keikoku Railway Watarase Keikoku Line

Roads

Expressways
 Kan-Etsu Expressway
 Tōhoku Expressway
 Jōshin-etsu Expressway
 Kita-Kantō Expressway (Takasaki-Hitachinaka)

National highways
 National Route 17 (Nihonbashi of Tokyo-Saitama-Kumagaya-Takasaki-Shibukawa-Ojiya-Nagaoka)
 National Route 18 (Takasaki-Annaka-Karuizawa-Komoro-Nagano-Myoko-Joetsu)
 National Route 50 (Maebashi-Isesaki-Oyama-Yuki-Mito)
 National Route 120
 National Route 122
 National Route 144
 National Route 145
 National Route 146
 National Route 254
 National Route 291
 National Route 292
 National Route 299
 National Route 353
 National Route 354
 National Route 405
 National Route 406
 National Route 407
 National Route 462

Prefectural symbols 
The prefectural symbol consists of the first kanji of the word 'Gunma' surrounded by three stylized mountains symbolizing the three important mountains of Gunma Prefecture: Mount Haruna, Mount Akagi, and Mount Myōgi.

For marketing, the Prefectural Government also uses Gunma-chan, a small super deformed drawing of a horse character wearing a green cap. It is used on promotional posters, banners, and other notable printed materials from the Prefectural Government. Other agencies and companies formally or informally use variations of its likeness and other horse-shaped characters when making signs or notices for work on buildings, roads, and other public notices.

In Popular culture 
There are various anime that have based their settings in Gunma, such as:
 Initial D
 A Place Further than the Universe
 The Flowers of Evil
 Nichijou
 You Don't know Gunma Yet

In the Pokemon franchise, Kanto Region's Pewter City, Route 3, and Mt. Moon are thought to be based on places found in Gunma.

See also
2022 Japan heatwave

Notes

References
 Nussbaum, Louis-Frédéric and Käthe Roth. (2005).  Japan encyclopedia. Cambridge: Harvard University Press. ;  OCLC 58053128

External links 

Gunma Prefecture Official Website 
Gunma Prefecture Official Website 

 
Kantō region
Prefectures of Japan